The Senior Women's Challenger Trophy is an Indian women's one-day cricket tournament. It is the women's version of NKP Salve Challenger Trophy. Established in the 2008–09 season, it is played with the purpose of showcasing the talent that the country has, as well as providing opportunities for younger players to make an impression. India Blue have won the tournament five times. The current champions are India A, who won the 2021–22 edition.

Teams 
India A, India B and India Senior were the three teams that battled it out in the inaugural edition of the Challenger Trophy, in 2008–09 season. The following year the teams were renamed to India Blue, India Green and India Red. Between the 2012–13 season and the 2016–17 season, India Green were exclusively an Under-19 team. For the 2021–22 tournament, four teams competed, named India A, India B, India C and India D.

Tournament results

References

 
Women's cricket competitions in India
Professional 50-over cricket competitions
Indian domestic cricket competitions
List A cricket competitions
2008 establishments in India